Francisco Santiago Sierra Ledezma (born December 28, 1987) is a Mexican professional boxer.

Professional career
Sierra lost a by knockout to Edison Miranda at Tachi Palace Hotel & Casino in Lemoore, California for the interim WBO NABO super middleweight title on October 22, 2009.

Panchito upset the return of former WBO World Champion Jose Luis Lopez in a 6 round TKO.

On July 30, 2009, Sierra won undefeated Super Middleweight contender, Don George (20-0-1, 17KO’s) by Technical Decision at the Buffalo Run Casino, Miami, Oklahoma for the vacant WBO NABO super middleweight title.
George went down once in the 7 round. Sierra went on to win on points but, because he had struck him after the bell had rung he was docked two points.

Professional boxing record

References

External links
 

Living people
1987 births
Super-middleweight boxers
Boxers from the State of Mexico
Mexican male boxers
People from Coacalco de Berriozábal